Lists of regions of Scotland: In the political geography of Scotland, there are various ways in which Scotland has historically been subdivided into regions and districts for various governmental purposes over time.

These include:
 Local government areas of Scotland 1973 to 1996—former system of regions and districts.
 Subdivisions of Scotland—unitary authority areas, in use from 1996 to present.
 Scottish Parliament constituencies and regions—in use from 1999 to present.
 Scottish Parliament constituencies and regions 1999 to 2011.
 Scottish Parliament constituencies and regions from 2011 to present.

Scotland geography-related lists